One is a limited edition EP. It was the 2nd release by Alli Rogers and was only available online or at her shows but is out of print and no longer available.

Track listing 
One Body – 3:55 
Hard To Get – 4:55 
Iowa – 4:27 
Praise The Lamb – 4:48 
One Body [Acoustic Demo] – 3:56

Notes
"Hard To Get" is only available on this EP.

2005 EPs